Arthur Patrick Matthews (died 25 January 1942) was an Irish politician and farmer. He was elected to Dáil Éireann as a Cumann na nGaedheal Teachta Dála (TD) for the Meath constituency at the September 1927 general election. He lost his seat at the 1932 general election.

References

Year of birth missing
1942 deaths
Cumann na nGaedheal TDs
Members of the 6th Dáil
Irish farmers
Politicians from County Meath
People educated at Castleknock College